Indiscretion is an 1800 comedy play by the British writer Hoare Prince.

The original Drury Lane cast included Thomas King as Sir Marmaduke Maxim, John Bannister as Burly, William Barrymore as Clermont, Robert Palmer as Frederic, Charles Holland as Gaylove, Ralph Wewitzer as Lounge, Alexander Webb as Francis, Montague Talbot as Algernon, Jane Pope as Victoria and Dorothea Jordan as Julia.

References

Bibliography
 Hogan, C.B (ed.) The London Stage, 1660–1800: Volume V. Southern Illinois University Press, 1968.
 Nicoll, Allardyce. A History of Early Nineteenth Century Drama 1800-1850. Cambridge University Press, 2009.

1800 plays
Comedy plays
West End plays
Plays by Prince Hoare